Author Emeritus was an honorary title annually bestowed by the Science Fiction and Fantasy Writers of America upon a living writer "as a way to recognize and appreciate senior writers in the genres of science fiction and fantasy who have made significant contributions to our field but who are no longer active or whose excellent work may no longer be as widely known as it once was." The Author Emeritus is invited to speak at the annual Nebula Awards banquet.

According to The Encyclopedia of Science Fiction, the award was for "apparently, long-time sf writers not considered worthy of Grand Master eminence". It was inaugurated in 1995 and conferred 14 times in 16 years through 2010 (at the 1994 to 2009 Nebula Awards banquets). The encyclopedia states that the 2001 award was controversial as it went to a writer who was still active at the time, and that after name changes to Author of Distinction in 2004 and Special Honoree in 2014, it "may since have been quietly discontinued".

Honorees

References

Science fiction awards
American speculative fiction awards